Odyssey: Pepsi to Apple is an autobiography by John Sculley, former Apple CEO, and John A. Byrne in August 1987, published by Harper & Row. In Odyssey, Sculley describes his time as CEO of PepsiCo and Apple during the late 1970s and early 80s. The epilogue of the book is dedicated to describing the Knowledge Navigator, a concept of Sculley's.

Reviews

External links 
 Odyssey: Pepsi to Apple : A Journey of Adventure, Ideas, and the Future (Hardcover) edition at Amazon.com

Books about businesspeople
1987 non-fiction books
Harper & Row books